"No Pasa Nada" is a song written and recorded by the American musical duo Ha*Ash. It was released on March 8, 2018 as the second of the single from their fifth studio album 30 de Febrero (2017). The song then included on their live album Ha*Ash: En Vivo (2019). It was written by Ashley Grace, Hanna Nicole and José Luis Ortega.

Background and release 
"No Pasa Nada" was written by Ashley Grace, Hanna Nicole and José Luis Ortega and produced by Hanna Nicole and George Noriega. The band started working on the song during the 1F Hecho Realidad Tour. It was confirmed the single to be the second single from the album on March 5, 2018. Finally, it was released on March 8, 2018.

On October 3, 2018 Ha*Ash became the first Latin singers to be featured in the Spotify Singles concept, publishing a new version of "No Pasa Nada", and a cover of "Adiós Amor".

Music video 
A lyric video for "No Pasa Nada" was released on December 1, 2017, the same day the album dropped. It was directed by Diego Álvarez. , the video has over 98 million views on YouTube.

The music video for "No Pasa Nada" was released on March 8, 2018. It was directed by Pablo Croce. , the video has over 49 million views on YouTube.

The acoustic video for "No Pasa Nada" was released on June 29, 2018. , the video has over 11 million views on YouTube.

The live video for "No Pasa Nada", recorded live for the live album Ha*Ash: En Vivo, was released on December 6, 2019. The video was filmed in Auditorio Nacional, Mexico City.

Commercial performance 
The track peaked at number 13 in the Mexico Airplay, number 4 in the Mexico Espanol Airplay charts in the México at number two on the Monitor Latino. On September 6, 2018 the song was certified gold in México. On February 1, 2019, it was announced that No Pasa Nada had been certified Platinum. On March 20, 2020 the song was certified double Platinum.

Live performances 
On November 11, 2018, the duo appeared on Premios Telehit, and also performed "No Pasa Nada".

Credits and personnel 
Credits adapted from Genius.

Recording and management

 Recording Country: United States
 Sony / ATV Discos Music Publishing LLC / Westwood Publishing
 (P) 2017 Sony Music Entertainment México, S.A. De C.V.

Ha*Ash
 Ashley Grace  – vocals, guitar, songwriting
 Hanna Nicole  – vocals, guitar, songwriting, production
Additional personnel
 José Luis Ortega  – songwriting
 Diego Contento  – engineer
 Dave Clauss  – engineer
 Pete Wallace  – engineer, edition, keyboards
 George Noriega  – engineer, edition, director, keyboards, guitar
 Matt Calderín  – drums

Charts

Weekly charts

Year-end charts

Certifications

Awards and nominations

Release history

References 

Ha*Ash songs
Songs written by Ashley Grace
Songs written by Hanna Nicole
Songs written by José Luis Ortega
Song recordings produced by George Noriega
2017 songs
2018 singles
Spanish-language songs
Sony Music Latin singles
2010s ballads
Pop ballads